Myrmosleichus is a genus of mites in the family Laelapidae.

Species
 Myrmosleichus coronatus (Berlese, 1903)

References

Laelapidae